Daniel Jacobus Erasmus (1830 - 1913) was a South African Boer political figure. He served as the acting president of Transvaal between 1871 and 1872.

The Erasmus Family History
The history of the Erasmus family began in 1688 when Pieter Erasmus arrived in Cape Town in 1688. He settled into a farm called "Groenkloof", located in Drakenstein. Pieter married Maria Elisabeth Joosten in 1691. The couple had six children. Pieter roamed a great deal to look for cultivable land, a trait that his descendant, Daniel Jacobus Erasmus (not the same person who acted as State President), inherited. It was Daniel Jacobus Erasmus and his family who among the first to occupy the land that in time became modern-day Pretoria.

In 1841, the 56 year old Daniel Jacobus Erasmus (1785 - 1861) arrived with his family in the area that is now Centurion. The area in Centurion including the Midvaal area was originally occupied by the Mogale clan and still has an active land claim over it. This land was seized and they were forcibly removed. A later retelling of history says they sold they the land. Like his ancestor Pieter, Daniel moved into a farm, which he named Zwartkop. But unlike his pioneering ancestor Daniel didn't find the farm site on his own. The place was recommended to him by his eldest son Daniel Elardus Erasmus. Elardus had happened into the area during an elephant hunt in 1831. He had found the area congenial for farming: There was great grazing grounds, pristine rivers and the absence of malaria. Taking his son's advice, Daniel acquired a large piece of land and settled down. Daniel Elardus Erasmus (1815 - 1875) settled on the farm Doornpoort in the area that is now known as Irene and other members of the family acquired other farms around the Pretoria area.

References

Presidents of the South African Republic
1830 births
1913 deaths
1870s in the South African Republic
1870s in Transvaal
19th-century South African people
19th-century South African politicians